Reziuan Mukhamedovich Mirzov (born 22 June 1993) is a Russian football player of Kabardian origin. He plays as a left winger for FC Khimki.

Personal life
He was born in Baksan.

Club career
He made his debut in the Russian National Football League for PFC Spartak Nalchik on 22 August 2012 in a game against FC SKA-Energiya Khabarovsk.

He scored a late winning goal as FC Tosno won the 2017–18 Russian Cup final with a score of 2–1 against FC Avangard Kursk on the 9 May 2018 in the Volgograd Arena.

On 31 August 2018, he joined FC Arsenal Tula on loan for the 2018–19 season.

On 18 July 2019, he signed a 3-year contract with FC Spartak Moscow.

On 2 October 2020, he was loaned to FC Khimki for the 2020–21 season.

On 7 September 2021, he returned to FC Khimki on a new loan for the 2021–22 season.

International career
He was first called up to Russia national football team for UEFA Euro 2020 qualifying matches against San Marino and Cyprus in June 2019.

On 11 May 2021, he was named as a back-up player for Russia's UEFA Euro 2020 squad.

Honours

Club
Tosno
 Russian Cup: 2017–18

Career statistics

Club

References

1993 births
People from Baksan
Sportspeople from Kabardino-Balkaria
Living people
Russian footballers
Association football midfielders
PFC Spartak Nalchik players
FC Spartak Kostroma players
FC Torpedo Moscow players
FC Akhmat Grozny players
FC Tosno players
FC Rostov players
FC Arsenal Tula players
FC Spartak Moscow players
FC Khimki players
Russian Premier League players
Russian First League players
Russian Second League players